More Mr. Nice Guy is a studio album by United States-based fusion band Garaj Mahal, released in 2010.

Critical reception
AllMusic wrote that "the quartet weaves through various strains of clearly identifiable commercial music while retaining its trailblazing spirit, making for a total listening experience appropriate for many different moods." The Philadelphia Inquirer called the album "robust," writing that "fans of electric jazz-fusion guitar masters like John McLaughlin, Pat Metheny and Larry Coryell should definitely get on board."

Track listing

Personnel

Fareed Haque – guitar
Sean Rickman – drums & vocals
Eric Levy – keyboards
Kai Eckhardt – bass

References

Garaj Mahal albums
2010 albums